Teiid may refer to:

 Teiidae, a family of lizards
 Teiid, Java software for data virtualization, see JBoss Developer Studio